Juan Manuel Bordeu (28 January 1934 – 24 November 1990) was a racing driver from Balcarce, Argentina. A protégé of Juan Manuel Fangio, Bordeu had a successful early career but a bad testing accident wrecked his chances in Formula One. His only World Championship Formula One entry was at the 1961 French Grand Prix in a Lotus run by the UDT Laystall team, but the car was eventually driven by Lucien Bianchi.

He raced on until his retirement in 1973, after which he represented his country as a delegate of FISA.

Complete Formula One results
(key)

References 
Profile at ESPN F1

1934 births
1990 deaths
People from Balcarce Partido
Sportspeople from Buenos Aires Province
Argentine racing drivers
Argentine Formula One drivers
British Racing Partnership Formula One drivers
Turismo Carretera drivers
World Sportscar Championship drivers

Carrera Panamericana drivers